JANJAN, short for Japan Alternative News for Justices and New Cultures, was a Japanese online newspaper started by Ken Takeuchi, journalist and former mayor of Kamakura, Kanagawa. Launched in February 2003, the newspaper is credited for pioneering citizen journalism in Japan.  After registration, anyone was free to post comments on the JANJAN website.  However, there were different windows for registering depending on the nationality or ethnicity of the potential poster (i.e. a different one for "Foreigners" (外国の方) and Japanese).

The bulk of the newspaper's revenue came from advertisements by its corporate sponsor. Due a lack of revenue, the newspaper ceased publication at the end of March 2010. In May of the same year, it was replaced by a journalistic blog named "JanJanBlog", which was operated until 31 December 2013. , articles on both the newspaper and blog are no longer available.

References 

 The article was originally a partial translation of the corresponding article (October 1, 2007) in Japanese Wikipedia.

External links
Official website in Japanese.

Asian news websites